Bai Jingfu (Chinese language: 白景富; Hanyu Pinyin: Bái Jǐngfù; July 1945) is a Chinese politician. He graduated from Jilin University in 1970.  He is a former executive deputy minister of the Ministry of Public Security of the People's Republic of China, and its deputy Party secretary. He has been an alternate member of the 16th Central Committee of the Chinese Communist Party and a member of the 17th Central Committee of the Chinese Communist Party.

References

People's Republic of China politicians from Hebei
1945 births
Living people
Jilin University alumni
Politicians from Tangshan
Chinese Communist Party politicians from Hebei
Chinese police officers